National Route 16 (N16) is a national highway of Morocco. It connects Tangier on the northwest coast of Morocco to Saidia on the northeast coast. It is an important highway running along the northern Middeteranean coast of the country. It passes through Tetouan, Al Houceima and other important cities.

Roads in Morocco